The 2012 OFC Nations Cup Final was the final match of the 2012 OFC Nations Cup. It was held on 10 June in Honiara between Tahiti and New Caledonia. Tahiti won the match 1–0.

Road to the final

Match

Details

References

OFC Nations Cup Finals
Tahiti national football team matches
Final
New Caledonia national football team matches
June 2012 sports events in Oceania